Lion of god may refer to:
 Ariel (name), a given name from Biblical Hebrew meaning "Lion of God"
 Asadullah, Imam Ali, a male Muslim given name meaning "Lion of God"
 Lion of God Ministry, a Latter Day Saint denomination

See also
 Lion and Sun, one of the main emblems of Iran
 Lion of Babylon, an ancient Babylonian symbol
 Lion of Judah, a Jewish national and cultural symbol